Jamie Douglas may refer to:

 Jamie Douglas (footballer) (born 1992), Northern Irish professional footballer
 Jamie Douglas (song), traditional ballad

See also
James Douglas (disambiguation)